Josh Colle is a Canadian politician. He was the councillor for Ward 15 on Toronto City Council for the years 2010-2018. Colle was the Chair of the Toronto Transit Commission during the period 2014-2018.

Politics

As city councillor, Colle served as a director on many high profile city agency boards, including the board of Toronto Hydro. In March 2012, he was elected by Toronto City Council to serve as a commissioner of the Toronto Transit Commission and was subsequently made chair in December, 2014.

He was instrumental in petitioning Metrolinx to include a station at Oakwood Avenue in their final plans for the Eglinton Crosstown line. It was confirmed that the Crosstown would feature a station at Oakwood in October 2012.

In 2018, a month after registering as a candidate in the 2018 municipal election, Colle withdrew his registration and announced his retirement from politics. His father Mike Colle subsequently announced his candidacy for councillor in the 2018 municipal election and ran in the new enlarged Ward 8 Eglinton Lawrence, comprising the former Ward 15 held by his son and Ward 16 represented by Christin Carmichael Greb. Mike Colle defeated Greb in Ward 16.

Election results

References

External links

Living people
Canadian people of Italian descent
Toronto city councillors
Year of birth missing (living people)